Daučík (masculine), Daučíková (feminine) is a Slovak surname. People with the surname include:

Ferdinand Daučík (1914-1986), Slovak footballer
Yanko Daucik (1941-2017), footballer, son of above
Anna Daučíková

Slovak-language surnames